Domino Chance is a comic originally published from 1982 through 1986 by Chance Enterprises. It would be later released under the title Amazing Comics. Written and drawn by Kevin Lenagh, the series lasted ten issues. It was self-published by Kevin's wife Sandra Lenagh and was later re-issued.

It was a sci-fi story about The Scarab, a spaceship captained by a cockroach named Domino Chance. He and the crew would do various odd-jobs for money.

This comic introduced Gizmo Sprocket, who made several appearances. Chance Enterprises also published Gizmo's first full-length comic before it moved to Mirage Studios.

Notes

External links 
 Kevin Lenagh Illustration

1982 comics debuts
Science fiction comics
Comics characters introduced in 1982
Fictional cockroaches